Mar'ie Muhammad (3 April 1939 – 11 December 2016) was an Indonesian politician and philanthropist. He served as the Minister of Finance under President Suharto from 1993 to 1998. He also served as the Chair of the Indonesian Red Cross Society (PMI) from 1998 to 2009.

During his period as Chair of PMI, the major 2004 earthquake and tsunami devastated Aceh and Nias. He travelled to areas affected and was active in arranging effective coordination between the Indonesian Red Cross and the national Indonesian Agency for Rehabilitation and Reconstruction in Aceh.

Muhammad died of brain cancer on 11 December 2016 at the National Brain Center Hospital in Cawang, Jakarta at the age of 77.

References
 

1939 births
2016 deaths
Deaths from brain cancer in Indonesia
Finance Ministers of Indonesia
Indonesian economists
Indonesian Muslims
Javanese people
People from Surabaya